Olaf L. Olsen (February 1, 1881 in Trysil, Norway – February 6, 1958 in Seattle) was a Republican member of the Washington House of Representatives who represented the 4th District (parts of Spokane County) from 1917 until his resignation in May 1925.

Notes

1881 births
1958 deaths
Republican Party members of the Washington House of Representatives
People from Spokane County, Washington
People from Trysil
20th-century American politicians
Norwegian emigrants to the United States